Waite's pipefish (Corythoichthys waitei) is a species of Indo-Pacific pipefish from the family Syngnathidae which is found from the Philippines east to Samoa, south to Papua New Guinea. It was previously considered to be a synonym of Corythoichthys intestinalis but is now considered to be a valid species by many authorities. The specific name honours the English ichthyologist Edgar Ravenswood Waite (1866-1928).

References

waitei
Fish described in 1906